Louisa Mary "Louise"  Cresswell born Louisa Mary Hogge aka The Lady Farmer (May 31, 1830 – July 2, 1916) was a British farmer and autobiographer. She had a farm in England and later lived in Texas. She is known for her autobiography which records an eighteen-year dispute with her English farm's landlord Edward, Prince of Wales.

Life
Cresswell was born in Biggleswade in 1830. She was the penultimate child of their eleven children of Eliza/Elisabeth (born Wells) and William Hogg(e). Her father was a successful businessperson before he inherited a similar string of businesses to his own from his brother. Cresswell was educated at a boarding school in Brighton.

In Norfolk she got to know Gerard Oswin Cresswell who came from a banking family but like her shared an interest in the outdoors. In 1859 he had become a tenant farmer at Sedgeford. She married him in April 1862 and the two of them went to live at an even larger 900 acre farm, Appleton, at Sandringham where they divided the business between them. The new owner of the land was the Prince of Wales.

In 1863 their baby daughter, Frances, died. They had one surviving child, Gerard Francis Oswald, who was born in 1864. In 1865, when she was 35. her husband died and she was left in sole charge of a large farm. 90% of large farms at that time were run by men and she did not have a working age son who could assist her. However, she did have the advice of a farmer named John Groom who had been her husband's guide to farming issues. She was soon taken to court by James Mingay who she had sacked after a few months. She represented herself in court and Mingay's application for lost wages was dismissed.

She became a subject of discussion as she attended farming events including shows and auctions and she was known as "The Lady Farmer". She had a long running dispute with Edmund/Edward Beck who was the steward of the land she leased. She particularly objected to the damage done to her land by the Prince's shooting parties. This included the damage that resulted from Edward VII’s addiction to shooting, Sandringham's tenant farmers being forbidden from shooting rabbits and hares as this was a privilege reserved for the Prince’s guests. The consequent damage caused to the farmers’ crops was intended to be compensated by the estate paying “game damages”.

In 1880 she left the Sandringham farm after receiving a notice to quit earlier in that year. The farm had suffered a number of years of poor crops and she had rent arrears.

In 1887 she published "Eighteen Years on Sandringham Estate" with the nom-de-plume of "The Lady Farmer". The book is a useful description of the life of a woman running a large estate and her disputes. Later commentators point out that the book was written in retribution and some of the facts like dates are misreported. In 1896 her former home at Sandringham, Appleton, was given to Maud of Wales and the future King Haakon VII as a wedding present by Edward VII.

Death and legacy
Cresswell died in Abilene in Texas and her remains were brought back to be buried in North Runcton. In 2008 a book was written about her dispute with Edward VII over Appleton Farm. The book was called "The Prince's Thorn: Edward VII and the Lady Farmer of Sandringham".

References

Bibliography
 

1830 births
1916 deaths
People from Biggleswade
19th-century English farmers
British women farmers